Jean Ruth Adams (1928–2004) was an American entomologist specializing in electron microscopy of insect pathogens, particularly viruses.

Notable works 
. Ph.D. dissertation.

References 

1928 births
2004 deaths
Women entomologists
American entomologists
Women virologists
American virologists
20th-century American zoologists